The Regency Townhouses are heritage-listed former terrace houses and now commercial offices located at 57-61 Lower Fort Street, in the inner city Sydney suburb of Millers Point in the City of Sydney local government area of New South Wales, Australia. The property was added to the New South Wales State Heritage Register on 2 April 1999.

History 
Millers Point is one of the earliest areas of European settlement in Australia, and a focus for maritime activities. This building is one of a group of fine Victorian Regency terraces based on the London model. First tenanted by Department of Housing in 1985.

Description 
Three storey Regency townhouse with basement based on the London model, set back from street and enclosed by cast-iron fence. Classic ionic entrance portico. Boarding house with three by one bedroom units and two by two bedroom units. Storeys: Three; Construction: Painted rendered masonry, corrugated galvanised iron roof. Spear fence. Style: Victorian Regency.

The external condition of the property is good.

Modifications and dates 
External: Windows and fanlight altered.

Heritage listing 
As at 23 November 2000, this building is a group of three Regency style townhouses based on London model of three storeys with basements, which are in almost intact exterior condition.

It is part of the Millers Point Conservation Area, an intact residential and maritime precinct. It contains residential buildings and civic spaces dating from the 1830s and is an important example of 19th century adaptation of the landscape.

Regency Townhouses was listed on the New South Wales State Heritage Register on 2 April 1999.

See also 

Australian residential architectural styles

References

Bibliography

Attribution

External links

 
 

New South Wales State Heritage Register sites located in Millers Point
Victorian Regency architecture in New South Wales
Terraced houses in Sydney
Articles incorporating text from the New South Wales State Heritage Register
Millers Point Conservation Area